Kellermensch is a Danish band. The band was formed in Esbjerg in 2006, they started out under the name Brudevalsen (bridal waltz), and took their name from the German translation of Fyodor Dostoyevsky's novella Notes from Underground.

The band released their eponymous debut album in January 2009.

In 2011, the band got a record deal with the Universal Music Group in Germany

Members
Christian Sindermann – vocals, pump organ
Sebastian Wolff – guitar, vocals
Jan V. Laursen – guitar
Claudio Wolff Suez – bass guitar
John V. Laursen – double bass, guitar
Anders Trans – drums

Discography

Albums
 Kellermensch (2009)
 Narcissus (2010)
 Kellermensch (2011)
 Goliath (2017)
 Capitulism (2022) – No. 16 Denmark

Singles
 "Moribund Town" (2010)
 "Black Dress / Rattle The Bones" (2011)
 "Bad Sign" (2017)
 "All That I Can Say" (2018)
 "Nothing" (2020)
 "Mission" (2020) 
 "Another Drink" (2021)

External links
Official website

References

Danish art rock groups
Musical groups established in 2006
Danish musical groups